Pavel Vladimirovich Melnikov (born 8 August 1969 in Novocherkassk) is an Olympic rower who competed for Russia in the two Olympic Games. He won bronze medal in the coxed eight competition 1996 Summer Olympics.

External links
sports-reference.com

1974 births
Russian male rowers
Soviet male rowers
Rowers at the 1996 Summer Olympics
Rowers at the 2000 Summer Olympics
Olympic rowers of Russia
Medalists at the 1996 Summer Olympics
Olympic medalists in rowing
Olympic bronze medalists for Russia
World Rowing Championships medalists for Russia
Living people
People from Novocherkassk
Sportspeople from Rostov Oblast